Kjersem is a Norwegian surname. Notable people with the surname include:

Hilde Marie Kjersem (born 1981), Norwegian artist, musician, and songwriter
Jakob Kjersem (1925–2009), Norwegian long-distance runner 

Norwegian-language surnames